Cave City is an unincorporated community in Calaveras County, California. The community is in ZIP code 95222 and area code 209.

Like most communities in Calaveras County, Cave City began as a mining town. However, its only claim to fame today is that it is the location of the California Caverns, the most extensive system of caverns and passageways in the area.

Politics

References

External links

Unincorporated communities in California
Unincorporated communities in Calaveras County, California